Lowlife: The Paris Concert is a live album by saxophonist Tim Berne's Bloodcount which was recorded in 1994 and released on the JMT label.

Lowlife was nominated for best mainstream jazz album at the National Association of Independent Recording Distributors and Manufacturers 1995 Indie Label awards.

Reception
The AllMusic review by Dave Lynch said "there is something very special about the three JMT CDs by the Bloodcount band ... In the first of the three, Lowlife, a searching quality tends to dominate the three lengthy tracks, as the band usually takes its time reaching explicit statements of Berne's (and Julius Hemphill's) thematic material. The music even meanders, but such a description shouldn't be put in a negative light. The band is in no hurry as it investigates Berne's sonic world, but is never reduced to aimless noodling; the musicians' improvisations remain too close to theme, melody, and mode -- or compelling abstraction -- for that".

Track listing
All compositions by Tim Berne except as indicated
 "Bloodcount" - 21:59  
 "Reflections - Lyric - Skin 1" (Julius Hemphill) - 17:07  
 "Prelude - The Brown Dog Meets the Spaceman" - 37:20

Personnel
Tim Berne - alto saxophone
Chris Speed - tenor saxophone, clarinet
Marc Ducret - electric guitar
Michael Formanek - contrabass
Jim Black - drums

References 

1995 live albums
Tim Berne live albums
JMT Records live albums
Winter & Winter Records live albums